The François-Xavier Garneau Medal is a book prize awarded by the Canadian Historical Association. Awarded only every five years since it was first awarded in 1980, the CHA describes the Medal as its "most prestigious" prize, honouring "an outstanding Canadian contribution to historical research." The Medal is named for François-Xavier Garneau, a 19th-century Quebecois poet and civil servant who wrote a classic three-volume history of the French Canadian nation entitled Histoire du Canada.

Recipients

See also 

 List of history awards

References

External links 

 Canadian Historical Association Prizes

History awards
Canadian non-fiction literary awards